The United States D-class submarines were a trio of submarines built for the United States Navy in the first decade of the 20th century. All three ships served during World War I providing training for crews and officers on the US East Coast, before the class was decommissioned and sold for scrap in 1922.

Description
The D-class submarines were enlarged versions of the preceding C class, the first American submarines armed with four torpedo tubes. They were built by the Fore River Shipbuilding Company of Quincy, Massachusetts, under a subcontract from the Electric Boat Company of Groton, Connecticut. They displaced  on the surface and  submerged. The D-class boats had a crew of 1 officer and 14 enlisted men.

For surface running, they were powered by two  NELSECO gasoline engines, each driving one propeller shaft. When submerged each shaft was driven by a  electric motor. Two 60-cell batteries provided power when submerged. They could reach  on the surface and  underwater.

The boats were armed with four 18-inch (45.7 cm) torpedo tubes in the bow. They did not carry reloads for them. They were the first US submarines to have four forward torpedo tubes which was standard until the Tambor class which joined the fleet in 1940.

These vessels included some features intended to increase underwater speed that were standard on US submarines of this era, including a small sail and a rotating cap over the torpedo tube muzzles. For extended surface runs, the small sail was augmented with a temporary piping-and-canvas structure. Apparently the "crash dive" concept had not yet been thought of, as this would take considerable time to deploy and dismantle. This remained standard through the L class, commissioned 1916-1917. The streamlined, rotating torpedo tube muzzle cap eliminated the drag that muzzle holes would otherwise cause. In the stowed position, the submarine appears to have no torpedo tubes, as the holes in the cap are covered by the bow stem.  This feature remained standard through the K class, after which it was replaced with shutters that were standard through the 1950s.

Ships
  was laid down on 16 April 1908, launched on 8 April 1909 and was commissioned on 23 November 1909 as Narwhal. Renamed D-1 on 17 November 1911, the submarine was decommissioned on 8 February 1922 and sold afterwards.
  was laid down on 16 April 1908, launched on 16 June 1909 and was commissioned on 23 November 1909 as Grayling. Renamed D-2 on 17 November 1911, the submarine was decommissioned on 18 January 1922 and sold afterwards.
  was laid down on 16 April 1908, launched on 12 March 1910 and was commissioned on 8 September 1910 as Salmon. Renamed D-3 on 17 November 1911, the submarine was decommissioned on 20 March 1922 and sold afterwards.

Notes

References
 
 
 Silverstone, Paul H., U.S. Warships of World War I (Ian Allan, 1970), .

External links

Navsource.org early submarines page
Pigboats.com D-boats page

Submarine classes
 
 D class